Kıvanç Tatlıtuğ (born 27 October 1983) is a Turkish actor, model, and former basketball player. He is one of the highest-paid actors in Turkey and has won many awards, including three Golden Butterfly Awards and a Yeşilçam Cinema Award. Tatlıtuğ won the pageants Best Model of Turkey and Best Model of the World in 2002. Tatlıtuğ has established himself as a leading actor of Turkey with roles in several of the highly successful television series, that includes Menekşe ile Halil (2007–2008), Aşk-ı Memnu (2008–2010), Kuzey Güney (2011–2013) and Cesur ve Güzel (2016–2017), all of which garnered him critical acclaim and international recognition, portraying researcher Arman in the Netflix original series Into the Night (2021) and Yakamoz S-245 (2022).

Early life and family
Tatlıtuğ was born on 27 October 1983, in Adana, to Erdem and Nurten Tatlıtuğ. His mother is Turkish from Edirne. His paternal grandfather is an Albanian immigrant from Pristina. His paternal grandmother is a Bosniak immigrant from Sarajevo. He has said that he was born and raised in Adana and that his family has had a bakery business in the city for more than a hundred years. He stated that he is a Muslim by religion, and was seen praying on Eid. He studied at Yenice Çağ Private High School, where he excelled in basketball. Due to his father's illness, the family moved to Istanbul so that his father could receive proper treatment.  In Istanbul, he joined the Beşiktaş, Fenerbahçe, Ülkerspor, "Fiskobirlik", "Güney Sanayi", "Çukurova Kulübü", "Devlet Su İşleri" and "Tarsus Amerikan Kulübü" clubs as a professional U18 basketball player. Due to a dislocated leg, he left basketball. He graduated from Istanbul Kultur University in 2013. He married stylist Başak Dizer on 19 February 2016 at the Turkish embassy in Paris. The couple's first child, a son named Kurt Efe, was born in April 2022. A sculpture of Tatlıtuğ has been displayed in Madame Tussauds Istanbul.

Career

Film career
He acted in the comedy film Amerikalılar Karadenizde 2, which was directed by Kartal Tibet. He provided the voice of Ken for the Turkish dubbed version of Toy Story 3. Tatlıtuğ played the poet Muzaffer Tayyip Uslu in the drama film Kelebeğin Rüyası with Farah Zeynep Abdullah. Kıvanç Tatlıtuğ won Yeşilçam Cinema Awards for Best Actor in a Leading Role and other awards for his performance as Muzaffer Tayyip Uslu.

Web series
He played as Arman in the Netflix surreal series Into the Night and Yakamoz S-245.

TV-series career
Kıvanç hosted some pageants and shows. He starred in Gümüş as the character Mehmet Şadoğlu. He had guest role in fantasy series Acemi Cadı of Turkish version "Sabrina Teenage Witch" with Merve Boluğur for second time. He has also starred in other shows such as Menekşe ile Halil, where he played alongside of Sedef Avcı. In the series Aşk-ı Memnu, Kıvanç shared the leading role with Beren Saat.

A turning point in Tatlıtuğ's career was when he played as Sekiz in Ezel. Since 2011, he has portrayed Kuzey Tekinoğlu in the Kanal D drama series Kuzey Güney, which ended in June 2013.  He won two Golden Butterfly Awards for Best Actor in a Leading Role for his performance in Aşk-ı Memnu and "Kuzey ve Güney". He later acted in the historical series Kurt Seyit ve Şura with Farah Zeynep Abdullah in 2014 and in Cesur ve Güzel with Tuba Büyüküstün in 2016–2017 as Cesur Alemdaroğlu. With Elçin Sangu, Onur Saylak, he played in crime series Çarpışma.

Filmography

Film

Streaming series

Television series

Awards and nominations

References

External links

 
 Kıvanç Tatlıtuğ at the SinemaTürk

1983 births
Living people
Turkish Muslims
20th-century Muslims
21st-century Muslims
21st-century Turkish male actors
Turkish people of Albanian descent
Turkish people of Bosniak descent
Turkish male film actors
Turkish male models
Turkish male television actors
People from Adana
Golden Butterfly Award winners